

The Ryson STP-1 Swallow is an American experimental two-seat powered cruising sailplane designed and built by the Ryson Aviation Corporation to be license built by other companies.

Design and development
The design of the Swallow was started in 1970 with the prototype completed during 1971, it was test flown from 1972. The Swallow is a cantilever mid-wing monoplane, the name is derived from the distinctive tail unit, it has a pusher propeller located between twin fins and rudders. The  Barking converted Volkswagen motor-car engine is mounted mid-fuselage and drives the two-bladed variable-pitch fully feathering pusher propeller using a  tubular shaft. To provide cooling a retractable air-scoop is mounted above the rear fuselage. The forward fuselage is an all-metal monocoque structure with the rear section made from welded steel-tube with a glassfibre covering. The all-metal single spar wing and the tandem two-seat enclosed cockpit were taken from a Schweizer SGS 2-32 glider. It has a bicycle type landing gear with outriggers on the wing tips, the nosewheel is retractable by hand and the main wheel is semi-prone and fixed.

Specifications

See also

References

Notes

Bibliography

1970s United States experimental aircraft
Motor gliders
Single-engined pusher aircraft
Aircraft first flown in 1972
Mid-wing aircraft